William Rose may refer to:

Sports
William Rose (footballer) (1861–1937), England international footballer
William Rose (cricketer, born 1934), former English cricketer
William Rose (cricketer, born 1842) (1842–1917), English cricketer
Bill Rose (born 1941), New Zealand darts player
Billy Rose (footballer, born 1904) (1904-1982), English footballer for Barrow and Bury
Bill Rose (footballer) (1931–2007), Australian rules footballer
Billy Rose (curler) (1904–1987), Canadian curler

Politicians
William Rose I (fl. 1393–1406), MP for Weymouth
William Rose (MP for Canterbury) (before 1410–after 1443), MP for Canterbury
William Oliver Rose (1871–1936), physician and politician in British Columbia, Canada
William Stewart Rose (1775–1843), poet, translator, Treasurer of the Navy, Member of Parliament
Sir William Rose (1803-1885), clerk of the Parliaments
William Anderson Rose (1820–1881), businessman, MP and Lord Mayor of London
William G. Rose (1829–1899), Republican mayor of Cleveland, Ohio
William Edward Rose, American hotelier, railroad president and politician in South Carolina

Others
William Balthazar Rose (born 1961), British painter
William Rose (schoolmaster and writer) (1719–1786), Scottish schoolmaster and classical scholar
William Cumming Rose (1887–1985), American nutritionist
William Rose (illustrator) (1909–1972), American film poster illustrator
William Rose (screenwriter) (1914–1987), American screenwriter
Axl Rose (William Rose, born 1962), Guns N' Roses vocalist
William I. Rose (geologist), American mineralogist
William I. Rose (general) (1898–1954), American military officer
Sir William Rose, 2nd Baronet (1846–1902), owner in Victorian times of Moor Park, Farnham
William Kinnaird Rose (1845–1919), editor of the Brisbane Courier
William John Rose (1885–1968), Canadian Slavist and historian
Billy Rose (1899–1966), American theatrical showman